A History of Britain is a BBC documentary series written and presented by Simon Schama, first transmitted in the United Kingdom from 30 September 2000.

A study of the history of the British Isles, each of the 15 episodes allows Schama to examine a particular period and tell of its events in his own style. All the programmes are of 59 minutes' duration and were broadcast over three series, ending 18 June 2002.

The series was produced in conjunction with The History Channel and the executive producer was Martin Davidson. The music was composed by John Harle, whose work was augmented by vocal soloists such as Emma Kirkby and Lucie Skeaping. Schama's illustrative presentation was aided by readings from actors, including Lindsay Duncan, Michael Kitchen, Christian Rodska, Samuel West and David Threlfall.

Background
When Simon Schama was approached by the BBC to make the series, he knew that it would be a big commitment and took a long time to decide whether it was something he wanted to do. He surmised that if he were to take it on, he would want to "dive in" and be very involved with the production. Besides writing the scripts, which the historian saw as a "screenplay", he also had input into other aspects, including the choice of locations. He was concerned that even 15 hour-long programmes would not be enough to tell a story of such magnitude. Accordingly, he and the producers determined that to give each king and queen absolute equal coverage was out of the question: "That way lies madness," he said. Instead, he worked out the essential themes and stories that demanded to be related.

Schama explained why, at the time of its making, it was right to produce another historical documentary on Great Britain. At that moment, he argued, Britain was entering a new phase of its relationship with Europe and the rest of the world, and where it would end up depended a great deal on where it's come from. He stated that the stories needed to be told again and again so that future generations could get a sense of their identity. Furthermore, he believed that Britain's history comprised a number of tales worth telling:
"No matter how much you tell them, you never quite know … how compelling and moving they are."

Criticisms
The main criticism of A History of Britain is that it mostly revolves around England and its history, rather than that of Great Britain in its entirety. It has been criticised for giving short shrift to the Celtic inhabitants and civilisation of Great Britain, including England, and for including Ireland, even though Ireland is not part of Great Britain (Northern Ireland being part of the United Kingdom, but not being part of Great Britain, while the Republic of Ireland is an independent and sovereign state). In a BBC interview, Simon Schama stated that rather than designating different periods of screen time to different nations, he focused on the relationships between the different nations, primarily England and Scotland. By the latter episodes, however, all "Three Kingdoms" are parts of the United Kingdom.

Episodes

Series 1 (2000) – At the Edge of the World?: 3000 BC–1603 AD

Series 2 (2001) – The British Wars: 1603–1776

Series 3 (2002) – The Fate of Empire: 1776–1965

DVDs and books

The series is available in the UK (Regions 2 and 4) as a six-disc DVD (BBCDVD1127, released 18 November 2002) in widescreen PAL format. Its special features include short interviews with Simon Schama, a text-based biography of the historian, and the inaugural BBC History Lecture of Schama's "Television and the Trouble with History".

In Region 1, it was released as A History of Britain: the complete collection on 26 November 2002. A five-disc set, the episodes were presented in full-frame NTSC format and included various text-based features.  It was re-released on 22 July 2008 in a new slim-case version. It was released again in Region 1 on 17 August 2010 in a format nearly identical to the UK version noted above.

Three accompanying books by Simon Schama have been published by BBC Books. All entitled A History of Britain, they were subtitled as follows:
At the Edge of the World?: 3000 BC–AD 1603 (19 October 2000)
The British Wars: 1603–1776 (4 October 2001)
The Fate of Empire: 1776–2001 (24 October 2002)

See also
This Sceptred Isle
Andrew Marr's History of Modern Britain

References

External links
 
 Screenonline: A History of Britain
 

2000 British television series debuts
2002 British television series endings
2000s British documentary television series
Television series about the history of the United Kingdom
BBC television documentaries about prehistoric and ancient history
BBC television documentaries about history during the 16th and 17th centuries
BBC television documentaries about medieval history
BBC television documentaries about history during the 18th and 19th centuries
BBC television documentaries about history during the 20th Century